The 2007 LSU Tigers football team represented Louisiana State University during the 2007 NCAA Division I FBS football season. It won the Southeastern Conference (SEC) championship and the national championship–their third claimed national championship and fourth recognized by the NCAA and the college football community.

The team's head coach was Les Miles, who entered his third year at the helm.  They were led on the field by senior quarterback Matt Flynn, running back Jacob Hester, and senior defensive tackle Glenn Dorsey, a two-time All-American and winner of multiple national trophies and awards. They played their home games at Tiger Stadium in Baton Rouge, Louisiana.

The team overcame two triple-overtime losses and four other close games to become the first, and only, two-loss national champion in the BCS/CFP era. On their way to the BCS national championship, the Tigers won their tenth SEC championship by defeating Tennessee in the SEC Championship Game.

The Tigers finished the season having earned the Southeastern Conference championship trophy, the Grantland Rice Award, the MacArthur Trophy, the Associated Press Trophy and the AFCA National Championship Trophy.

Previous season
In his second season as head coach, Les Miles had another terrific year leading the Tigers to back-to-back 11 win seasons. The Tigers finished 2006 with a record of 11–2 (6–2 SEC) and were invited to the 2007 Allstate Sugar Bowl to play Notre Dame. The Tigers went on defeat Notre Dame 41–14 to cap a 7-game win streak to end the season. The Tigers headed into the off-season with higher hopes for the 2007 Season.

Pre-season
LSU was ranked No. 2 in the preseason USA Today Coaches Poll and the preseason AP Poll.

In the pre-season, returning quarterback Matt Flynn was named one of the top-10 impact seniors for 2007.  Senior tailback Alley Broussard left the team on July 24 to concentrate on academics. Broussard had started eight games, but was not expected to start in 2007.

Coaching changes
Jimbo Fisher decided to leave LSU after seven years as the offensive coordinator to take the same position at FSU, where he was designated as the eventual successor to head coach Bobby Bowden. He was replaced by Gary Crowton who was the offensive coordinator for Oregon in 2005 & 2006.
Todd Monken, who came to LSU with Les Miles in 2005, decided to leave after just two years as the passing game coordinator/wide receivers coach. It is rumored that Monken was unhappy that he was not chosen as the OC.  He was replaced by D.J. McCarthy.
Stacey Searles, the offensive line coach, was replaced by Greg Studrawa who had been the offensive coordinator at Bowling Green the previous four years.  Searles left LSU to take the same position at Georgia.

2007 recruiting class
LSU signed a total of 26 players for the 2007 recruiting class. The 2007 class was a solid recruiting class for Les Miles and the LSU Football program. The class was headlined by safety Chad Jones, wide receivers Demetrius Byrd and Terrance Tolliver, quarterback Jarrett Lee, and defensive tackle Joseph Barksdale.  LSU did miss out on signing Joe McKnight, the top recruit out of Louisiana who decided to commit to USC instead.  Overall, the 2007 LSU recruiting class was ranked No. 4 by rivals.com and No. 5 by scout.com.

Key losses
Dwayne Bowe, WR, first round draft pick
Craig Davis, WR, first round draft pick
LaRon Landry, S, first round draft pick
JaMarcus Russell, QB, first overall draft pick
Justin Vincent, RB, 2003 SEC Championship & Sugar Bowl MVP

Schedule
The schedule was ranked as the No. 3 toughest home schedule.

Schedule Source:

Rankings

Game summaries

Mississippi State

LSU and Mississippi State kicked off the 2007 college football season in a Thursday night SEC contest broadcast live on ESPN. Through much of the first half it appeared as though Mississippi State was up to the daunting task of challenging the Tigers, then the #2-ranked team in the country behind only USC, as MSU clung to a 3–0 deficit until the end of the second quarter, when LSU scored 14 points in the last six minutes of the first half, opening the door for the Tigers to cruise to the final 45–0 margin.

LSU K Colt David warmed up the scoreboard for the Tigers' offense with a 27-yard field goal with 6:28 remaining in the first quarter. Tigers' RB Keiland Williams would score twice in the second quarter on one-yard runs with 5:52, then 0:00 on the clock to push LSU's lead to 17–0 at the half. In the third quarter, the Tigers' distanced themselves with two eleven-yard touchdown passes from QB Matt Flynn to WR Early Doucet (12:53) and RB Charles Scott (2:09), bringing the score to 31–0 to start the fourth quarter. LSU backup QB Ryan Perriloux sealed the Tigers' victory in the fourth quarter with a three-yard touchdown scramble (8:20), followed by a 15-yard touchdown pass to WR Brandon LaFell (5:45).

LSU's dominance included earning 22 first downs to MSU's 9 and yielding MSU just ten rushing yards on 26 carries. LSU FB Jacob Hester led the Tigers with 14 carries for 72 yards (4.9 yards per carry), while Early Doucet paced LSU's passing attack with 9 catches for 78 yards, including the 11-yard touchdown strike he caught in the third quarter; he was the only LSU receiver to catch more than one pass. For MSU, RB Anthony Dixon led the Bulldogs on the ground with just 29 yards on 13 carries (2.2 average). RB Arnil Stallworth led MSU with only 3 pass receptions for 33 yards.

LSU starting QB Matt Flynn paced his team's offense by completing 12 of 19 passes for 128 yards and two touchdowns and rushing 11 times for 42 yards. Ryan Perriloux ran the Tigers' offense well in relief duty, completing 2 of 3 passes for 21 yards and a touchdown and running 3 times for 12 yards and another score. For MSU, QB Michael Henig completed just 11 of 28 passes on his way to a school record-tying six interception-performance. He was sacked three times for a cumulative loss of 30 yards.

Defensively, LSU LB Ali Highsmith led the Tigers with eight total tackles. Tigers' S Craig Steltz returned three of MSU's six interceptions a total of 100 yards. MSU LB Dominic Douglas led all tacklers with nine total, in his first career game with the Bulldogs.

Virginia Tech

The ESPN College GameDay crew was in Baton Rouge, Louisiana for this important non-conference matchup between two top-10 teams. LSU entered the game ranked No. 2 while Virginia Tech was ranked #9. With both teams having excellent defenses the game was expected to be a low-scoring affair. LSU, however, on their first possession drove the ball 80+ yards for a touchdown. The next time they got the ball they did the same thing. LSU continued to shock the Virginia Tech defense all night as it racked up 48 points to eventually win the game 48–7.

Middle Tennessee State

Second ranked LSU played Middle Tennessee State in front of a sold out crowd in Tiger Stadium. Head coach Les Miles didn't play starting QB Matt Flynn because of an ankle injury he suffered during the week, and to rest him for next weeks game at home against the South Carolina Gamecocks. Instead, he started Sophomore Ryan Perrilloux who threw 20–26 passing for 298 passing yards to help lead LSU to a 44–0 win against MTSU. Senior WR Early Doucet didn't play to rest for next weeks game as well. LSU held Middle Tennessee to a total of 90 yards on offense. LSU only allowed 9 yards rushing in the game against the same MTSU team that put up 264 yards of total rushing against Louisville the week before. LSU won the game 44–0.

South Carolina

#14 South Carolina, coached by Steve Spurrier, came into Tiger Stadium on a rainy Saturday afternoon. The game, broadcast nationally by CBS, was messy due to the wet conditions, and South Carolina took an early 7–0 lead. LSU responded by scoring two unanswered touchdowns to make it 14–7. LSU again drove down into South Carolina territory but the drive stalled and the Tigers lined up to kick a field goal. The kick was a fake, perfectly executed by QB Matt Flynn and K Colt David, which saw David take an over-the-head no look toss from Flynn into the end zone for a touchdown. The play would go on to be selected as the ESPN/Pontiac Game Changing Performance for week 4 of the 2007 season.  South Carolina would score again late in the fourth quarter but it wasn't enough and the Tigers won the game 28–16.

Tulane

LSU played Tulane in a recently renewed rivalry that stretches all the way back to LSU's first football game in 1893. The Tigers started out slow and Tulane took a 9–7 lead late in the first half. LSU would score a field goal to go into halftime with a 10–9 lead. The second half saw the Tigers pull away from the Green Wave and LSU won the game 34–9.

LSU and Tulane both wore special uniforms designed by Nike to honor Hurricane Katrina victims. The new designs will be sold at stores throughout the city and proceeds will benefit Nike's Let Me Play New Orleans fund to help rebuild New Orleans through Sport.  LSU's uniforms consisted of white pants and a purple jersey and a white helmet. This is only the second time in history that LSU has worn a white helmet. The other time came in the 1997 Independence Bowl against Notre Dame.

The LSU victory, along with Southern California's close game with Washington, pushed LSU to the No. 1 ranking in the AP Poll, with 1,593 points and 33 first-place votes just over Southern California's 1,591 points and 32 first-place votes; however the Trojans remained No. 1 in the Coaches Poll, keeping a more substantial lead: 1,483 points and 45 first-place votes to LSU's 1,454 points and 14 first-place votes.

Florida

    
    
    
    
    
    
    
    

In the pre-season, this game was named as one of candidates for the 10 most important games of 2007, with the 2006 contest having made a significant impact on determining the national championship (Florida finished #1, LSU #3); it would also serve as the first true road test for Gator's starting quarterback Tim Tebow.

In preparation for the matchup, CBS staged The Early Show from the LSU campus on the Friday morning before the game.  ESPN also chose LSU as the site for College GameDay.  It was the second time in the 2007 season that ESPN College GameDay was broadcast from LSU.

The Gators took an early lead by kicking a field goal on their first drive. Two drives later, the Gators mounted a 12-play drive that culminated in a Tim Tebow two-yard pass to Kestahn Moore to put the Gators up by ten. LSU immediately countered with a long drive of their own, going 80 yards in 16 plays, scoring on a Ryan Perrilloux option play to cut the Gator lead to 10–7. The Gators marched down the field again and scored on a Tebow run to put their lead back at 10 with 2:23 to play in the first half. LSU moved the ball right before the half, but kicker Colt David missed a 43-yard field goal.

In the second half, LSU took the ensuing drive but were stopped by the Gator defense. Appearing to kick another long field goal, LSU instead ran a brilliant fake with the holder—quarterback Matt Flynn—who scooted eight yards for the first down. The Tigers scored on a Keiland Williams run shortly thereafter.

The Gators answered the LSU drive with a quick 3-play drive to score on a 37-yard Tebow pass to Cornelius Ingram. Craig Steltz missed an assignment on the play which left Ingram wide open on the post pattern. Florida started the fourth quarter with a 24–14 lead.

However, the Tigers were not to be denied. After missing another relatively short field goal, LSU took advantage of an errant pass by Tim Tebow which hit Ingram in the helmet. The Tigers drove down the field, and Flynn hit Demetrius Byrd for a 3-yard touchdown to cut the Gator lead to 3.

On the final LSU drive, the Tigers converted several fourth down plays, including one by Jacob Hester where he made a great second effort to surge ahead to just get the first down. Hester scored a short touchdown with 1:06 to play in the game, giving the Tigers a 28–24 lead.

On the final drive, Florida gained 30 yards, but a Hail Mary pass as time expired was batted down by Chad Jones, sealing the LSU victory.

Much of the hype during game week concerned the fate of starting safety and captain, Tony Joiner, who was arrested earlier in the week for what was later termed a "misunderstanding." The owner of the towing company where Joiner was arrested was quoted as having received over 200 calls from Florida fans, several of them death threats to him and his family.  Joiner played but did not start the game.

Kentucky

After suffering their first loss of the season to No. 17 Kentucky, LSU fell to No. 5 in the polls. LSU blew a 13-point lead in the 3rd quarter.

Auburn

One week after their brutal triple overtime loss to Kentucky, LSU returned home for another tough matchup: number 17 Auburn. Auburn jumped out to an early 7–0 lead when Brandon Cox found Montez Billings. A 46-yard screen pass to Keiland Williams for a TD tied it, but Auburn took a 17–7 lead into halftime when LSU backup quarterback Ryan Perrilloux fumbled, and Carl Stewart ran for a one-yard touchdown after LSU's Trindon Holliday had saved a touchdown. Wes Bynum's field goal capped the first half scoring. Two Colt David field goals pulled LSU within four before Matt Flynn hit Jacob Hester on a five-yard screen and David kicked another field goal to put LSU on top 23–17. But, Auburn wasn't done, as they drove down the field and scored a touchdown. LSU had 3:13 left, and they put themselves in good position to kick a game-winning field goal on Auburn's 22-yard line. However, with a chance to make the kick and a timeout, LSU coach Les Miles chose to gamble (as he has so often during the year) and go for a touchdown. It turned out as he planned however, as LSU won on Matt Flynn's 22-yard pass to Demetrius Byrd. Miles later said he thought he had plenty of time, and reviews of the play verified that the pass was caught with 4 seconds remaining, but the clock ran until the referee signaled TD with 1 second remaining. Under NCAA rules, the clock keeper allows the clock to run when a reception is made in the endzone until a signal is given by the endzone referee. Had the ball been incomplete, the clock keeper would have stopped the clock immediately upon the ball hitting the ground. This likely would have left LSU with 3–4 seconds on the clock and a chance to run another play.

Alabama

In the game dubbed "Saban Bowl I", in which Nick Saban's new Alabama team faced an LSU team that featured several players Saban himself had recruited during his tenure in Baton Rouge, the Tide found itself in an SEC shootout. Alabama struck first with an early Leigh Tiffin field goal. However, the Tigers then scored 17 unanswered points, and it appeared that the game could have been a blowout. Unfortunately for LSU though, Bama wasn't finished yet. They scored 17 points in the second quarter, and the Crimson Tide led 20–17 at halftime. The third quarter saw no scoring until the last two minutes. With 1:19 left, Keith Brown caught a 14-yard touchdown pass to make the score 27–17. The Tigers quickly responded on their next drive when Matt Flynn threw a 61-yard touchdown pass to Demetrius Byrd to bring the Tiger back to within 3 points of Bama. Then, with 11:21 left in the game, Colt David kicked a 49-yard field goal to tie it up 27–27. The Tide took the lead again when Javier Arenas returned a punt for a 61-yard touchdown. With 2:49 left, LSU was able to tie the game again. It appeared the game might go into overtime until John Parker Wilson was hit in the backfield by Safety Chad Jones and fumbled the ball and LSU recovered on the Tide's 4-yard line. They then ran it in for a touchdown and won when Alabama was unable to respond. The Tigers had 475 total yards compared to Alabama's 254. Alabama was able to stay in the game thanks to 3 interceptions the defense was able to force and 130 yards in penalties that LSU accumulated. John Parker Wilson was 14 for 40 with 234 yards, 3 touchdowns, and an interception.

Louisiana Tech

Ole Miss

Arkansas

After coming off of a win against Ole' Miss, the once again No. 1 ranked LSU Tigers lost again in a triple overtime battle against the Arkansas Razorbacks. The loss dropped them back to No. 7 and the loss also jeopardized their chances of getting into the BCS National Championship.

SEC Championship Game: Tennessee

Tennessee and LSU faced off in the SEC Championship Game. They last met in the SECCG in 2001. LSU won that game over the favored Volunteers, eliminating them from a trip to the Rose Bowl for the national championship. LSU last played in the SECCG in 2005, losing to Georgia. Tennessee last played in the SECCG in 2004, losing to Auburn. Matt Flynn was sidelined by injury, and the Tennessee defense delivered its best performance of the year, holding the Ryan Perrilloux-led Tigers to a season low 21 points. However, the LSU defense intercepted two passes from Tennessee quarterback Erik Ainge, including one late in the fourth quarter to secure the win. In the wake of this victory, LSU jumped from 7th to 2nd in the BCS standings and became the first two-loss team to play in the BCS National Championship Game.

2008 Allstate BCS National Championship Game

After coming out of a two loss season with a win in the SEC championship game, the LSU Tigers took on the top ranked Ohio State Buckeyes and defeated them 38–24. This win made the LSU Tigers the first team to win two BCS National Championships.

Honors

White House visit

On April 7, 2008, the 2007 LSU Tigers football team traveled to the White House in Washington, D.C. to meet U.S. President George W. Bush.

Roster

Roster source: http://www.lsusports.net/SportSelect.dbml?SPSID=27812&SPID=2164&DB_OEM_ID=5200&SORT_ORDER=6&Q_SEASON=2007

Coaching staff

LSU Tigers in the 2008 National Football League Draft 

https://www.pro-football-reference.com/draft/2008.htm

References

LSU
LSU Tigers football seasons
BCS National Champions
Southeastern Conference football champion seasons
LSU Tigers football